Donna Ulisse is an American country music and bluegrass singer-songwriter. Signed to Atlantic Records in 1991, she released her debut album, Trouble at the Door, that year and two singles which charted on the Billboard Hot Country Singles & Tracks chart. She appeared on national TV shows Hee Haw, Nashville Now, Crook & Chase, and NBC's Hot Country Nights.

Ulisse's debut album Trouble at the Door charted the singles "Things Are Mostly Fine" and "When Was the Last Time". The former received a positive review in Cash Box magazine which stated that she "generates a soothing ballad quilted with a powerful force of emotion and inspiration".

After leaving Atlantic Records in the early 1990s, Ulisse took some time off and concentrated on song writing, however she did make some appearances. She returned in 2007, this time recording bluegrass music, with a new album When I Look Back on Hadley Music Group. Ulisse toured with her band The Poor Mountain Boys performing at festivals and concert venues.

She won the award for 2016 International Bluegrass Music Association’s Songwriter of the Year and in 2017 she won International Bluegrass Music Association's song of the Year with "I Am A Drifter", co-written with Marc Rossi. Ulisse landed SPBGMA's Songwriter of the Year in the same year. In 2017, she signed with Mountain Home Music Company, and released her eleventh album Breakin' Easy, later that year, produced by Doyle Lawson.

In 2019, Ulisse signed with a new bluegrass label, Billy Blue Records, and released an album, Time For Love, on November 1, 2019.

Ulisse released her second album and her thirteenth album overall, Livin' Large for Billy Blue Records on February 25, 2022.

Discography

Albums

Singles

Music videos

References

External links 
 

American women country singers
American country singer-songwriters
Living people
Atlantic Records artists
Year of birth missing (living people)
Musicians from Hampton, Virginia
Country musicians from Virginia
Singer-songwriters from Virginia
20th-century American singers
20th-century American women singers
21st-century American singers
21st-century American women singers